Saphenista beta is a species of moth of the family Tortricidae. It is found in Carchi Province, Ecuador.

The wingspan is about 13.5 mm. The ground colour of the forewings is whitish with weak, cream brown suffusions and sparse brown dots. The markings are brownish. The hindwings are cream white, mixed with pale brownish on the periphery.

Etymology
The species name refers to the numeration of genitally similar species and is derived from the second
letter of the Greek alphabet).

References

Moths described in 2007
Saphenista